Geroldo Guimarães Ramos (born 14 March 1933), known as just Geroldo, is a Brazilian footballer. He played in one match for the Brazil national football team in 1959. He was also part of Brazil's squad for the 1959 South American Championship that took place in Ecuador.

References

External links
 

1933 births
Living people
Brazilian footballers
Brazil international footballers
Association football defenders
Sportspeople from Ceará